Domenico Morgante (born 1956) is an Italian musicologist, organist and harpsichordist.

Biography
As a researcher he has worked on various European Projects of Music. Of many compositions of the past has performed salvages and restorations critics (Girolamo Frescobaldi, Giorgio Lapazaya, Jacquet de Berchem,

 Giacomo Insanguine, Salvatore Fighera, Onofrio van Westerhout, Giuseppe de Ferrariis).
As a musicologist has to his credit a hundred publications in Italy and abroad. At the end of the 1960s, though very young, was among the first in Italy to deal with philological interpretation of Ancient Music and the concertism  with historical instruments. 
He directed the restoration of important historical keyboard instruments, collaborating on several occasions with the Italian Ministry of Cultural Heritage and Activities. Since its founding in 1985 he has been the Director of the Mediterranean Institute of Musicology. He was awarded Professor Emeritus in the Organ Academy "Giacomo Insanguine" of Monopoli (Bari), for his outstanding teaching in the field of the organ he was awarded the Premio Abbiati Italian Music Critics under the High Patronage of the President of the Republic (Fiesole, 2008).
In 2013 he received awards from the art world and from the Albanian academic world (Biennale Music, Durrës; Ministry of Culture, Tirana).

References 

1956 births
Italian musicologists
Italian harpsichordists
Living people
People from Monopoli